The canton of La Côte Vermeille is a canton of France, in the Pyrénées-Orientales department. Its chief town is Argelès-sur-Mer (before 2015: Port-Vendres).

Composition

At the French canton reorganisation which came into effect in March 2015, the canton was expanded from 4 to 7 communes:
Argelès-sur-Mer 
Banyuls-sur-Mer  
Cerbère
Collioure
Palau-del-Vidre 
Port-Vendres 
Saint-André

See also 
 Cantons of the Pyrénées-Orientales department
 Communes of the Pyrénées-Orientales department

References

Cote vermeille